Gold(V) fluoride is the inorganic compound with the formula Au2F10. This fluoride compound features gold in its highest known oxidation state. This red solid dissolves in hydrogen fluoride but these solutions decompose, liberating fluorine.

The structure of gold(V) fluoride in the solid state is centrosymmetric with hexacoordinated gold and an octahedral arrangement of the fluoride centers on each gold center. It is the only known dimeric pentafluoride, although sulfur can form disulfur decafluoride; other pentafluorides are monomeric (P, As, Sb, Cl, Br, I), tetrameric (Nb, Ta, Cr, Mo, W, Tc, Re, Ru, Os, Rh, Ir, Pt), or polymeric (Bi, V, U). In the gas phase, a mixture of dimer and trimer in the ratio 82:18 has been observed.

Gold pentafluoride is the strongest known fluoride ion acceptor, exceeding the acceptor tendency of even antimony pentafluoride.

Synthesis
Gold(V) fluoride can be synthesized by heating gold metal in an atmosphere of oxygen and fluorine to 370 °C at 8 atmospheres to form dioxygenyl hexafluoroaurate:

Au(s) + O2(g) + 3 F2(g) → O2AuF6(s)
This salt decomposes at 180 °C to produce the pentafluoride:
 2 O2AuF6(s) → Au2F10 (s) + 2 O2(g) + F2(g)

Krypton difluoride can also oxidise gold to the +5 oxidation state:

 7  (g) + 2 Au (s) → 2 KrFAuF (s) + 5 Kr (g)

KrFAuF decomposes at 60 °C into gold(V) fluoride and gaseous krypton and fluorine:

2 KrFAuF →  (s) + 2 Kr (g) + 2  (g)

References

Fluorides
Metal halides
Gold compounds
Gold–halogen compounds